Ken Flach and Rick Leach were the defending champions, but Flach did not participate this year.  Leach partnered Danie Visser.

Leach and Visser won the title, defeating Scott Davis and Trevor Kronemann 6–4, 4–6, 7–6 in the final.

Seeds

  Jan Apell /  Jonas Björkman (semifinals)
  Martin Damm /  Andrei Olhovskiy (semifinals)
  Rick Leach /  Danie Visser (champions)
  Brent Haygarth /  Brad Pearce (quarterfinals)

Draw

Draw

References
Draw

Doubles